Glasgow Govan was a constituency of the Scottish Parliament (Holyrood). It elected one Member of the Scottish Parliament (MSP) by the plurality (first past the post) method of election.

For the 2011 election, the constituency was abolished. The Govan electoral ward was divided between Glasgow Pollok and Glasgow Southside.

Electoral region 

The region covers the Glasgow City council area and a north-western portion of the South Lanarkshire council area.

Constituency boundaries and council areas 

The Glasgow Govan constituency was created at the same time as the Scottish Parliament, in 1999, with the name and boundaries of an  existing Westminster constituency. In 2005, however, Scottish Westminster (House of Commons) constituencies were mostly replaced with new constituencies.

The Holyrood constituency covered a western portion of the Glasgow City council and small western portion of Renfrewshire Council.

Glasgow Govan was south of the Kelvin constituency, west of Shettleston and north of Cathcart and Pollok, which were all entirely within the city area.

Boundary review 

Following the First Periodic review into constituencies of the Scottish Parliament for the 2011 election, the Boundary Commission for Scotland recommended the abolition of the Glasgow Govan constituency. The seat created is known as Glasgow Southside formed by the combination of Southside Central, and Pollokshields wards with the addition of the eastern half of the Govan division.

Member of the Scottish Parliament 

The First Minister, Nicola Sturgeon, represented the constituency from the 2007 election. She was previously an MSP for the Glasgow regional list from 1999 to 2007, during which time she was Leader of the Opposition at Holyrood from 2004 to 2007.

Election results

See also
 Politics of Scotland

Notes 

Rejected ballots for 2007 election, BBC News

Scottish Parliament constituencies and regions 1999–2011
Govan
Politics of Glasgow
1999 establishments in Scotland
Constituencies established in 1999
2011 disestablishments in Scotland
Constituencies disestablished in 2011
Pollokshields
Pollokshaws